Jeremy Burchill (born 1952) is a former barrister and unionist politician in Northern Ireland.

Burchill studied at Campbell College and Queen's University, Belfast, then became chair of the Ulster Young Unionist Council.  He contested the Northern Ireland Constitutional Convention election in Belfast South in 1975, and was elected for the Ulster Unionist Party, becoming the youngest member of the convention.  At the 1979 UK general election, he stood in North Antrim, taking second place, with 23.4% of the vote.

Burchill was elected to Belfast City Council, representing Area A, in 1981.  He was also elected in the 1982 Northern Ireland Assembly election, taking a seat in Belfast East. He stood in the equivalent seat at the 1983 UK general election, taking 24.8% of the vote.

Outside politics, Burchill was a member of both the Northern Ireland and English Bar, but had more recently worked as a consultant to financial service companies.

References

1952 births
Living people
Alumni of Queen's University Belfast
Members of the Bar of England and Wales
Members of the Bar of Northern Ireland
Members of the Northern Ireland Constitutional Convention
Northern Ireland MPAs 1982–1986
People educated at Campbell College
Ulster Unionist Party politicians
Barristers from Northern Ireland